"Love Whisper" (: "If you listen carefully") is a song recorded by South Korean girl group GFriend for their fifth extended play Parallel (2017). The song was released by Source Music on August 1, 2017, as the EP title track. It has sold over 471,879 downloads as of September 2017.

Composition 
The song was described by Billboards Tamar Herman, as a "midtempo pop song" that incorporates a variety of playful sound effects, from birds chirping, brassy horns, twinkling chimes, water droplets, and even a guitar solo.

Chart performance 
The song debuted at number 2 on the Gaon Digital Chart, on the chart issue dated July 30 – August 5, 2017, with 158,284 downloads – topping the Download Chart – and 3,198,664 streams. It has sold over 471,879 downloads as of September 2017.

It also debuted at number 13 on Billboard's Korea K-pop Hot 100.

Music video 
The music video was released on August 1 and passed seven million views on its first day.

Live performances 
GFriend held their first performance of "Love Whisper" on MBC Music's Show Champion on August 2, 2017. They continued on Mnet's M Countdown on August 3, KBS's Music Bank on August 4, MBC's Show! Music Core on August 5, and SBS's Inkigayo on August 6.

Accolades

Charts

References 

2017 songs
2017 singles
GFriend songs
Korean-language songs
Kakao M singles
Hybe Corporation singles